Viktoria Valerievna Tereshkina (born 31 May 1983) is a Russian ballet dancer, who performs as a principal dancer with the Mariinsky Ballet in Saint Petersburg. People's Artist of Russia (2018). Laureate of the highest theater award of St. Petersburg "Golden Soffit" (2005, 2006), and Laureate of the IX International Ballet Competition "Arabesque" (Perm, 2006).

Early life
Tereshkina was born in Krasnoyarsk in Siberia where her father was a gymnastics teacher. From the age of four she was trained in artistic gymnastics in which she performed increasingly well. However, when she reached the age of 10, her parents decided her prospects for an extended career would be better in ballet. As a result, she was sent to the ballet school in Krasnoyarsk. When she was 16, she took part in a ballet festival in Saint Petersburg. She was noticed by Igor Belsky who recommended she should join the Vaganova Academy of Russian Ballet where he was artistic director. After training for five years in Krasnoyarsk, she therefore spent a further three years in Saint Petersburg in the class of Marina Vassilieva.

Tereshkina is married to Artem Shpilevsky (former soloist with the Bolshoi Ballet) and they have one daughter named Milada born in 2013.

Career
Following her graduation in 2001, Tereshkina immediately joined the Mariinsky Ballet where she became a soloist in 2005 and a principal in 2008. She debuted as Odette/Odile in Swan Lake in 2002; it was her first principal role.

Tereshkina has performed in Mariinsky's extensive repertoire of classical and modern ballet. Particularly notable are her Gamzatti and Nikya in La Bayadère, Kitri in Don Quixote, Odette/Odile in Swan Lake, Queen Mekhemene Banu in A Legend of Love, and Terpsichore in Apollo. Writing in The Daily Telegraph, Sarah Crompton referred to her as a "rising talent", describing her as a "filigree beauty" with "fiendish fouettés".

She created the role of Parasha in Yuri Smekalov's production of The Bronze Horseman (2016), Paquita in Smekalov's revival of the ballet of the same name (2017), and The Mistress of Copper Mountain in the Mariinsky revival of Yury Grigorovich's The Stone Flower in 2016.

In 2010, Tereshkina danced Aurora in Konstantin Sergeyev's version of the Sleeping Beauty when it was presented at the Kennedy Center in Washington D.C. She has toured with the Mariinsky to the United States (California, Washington D.C., and New York City) and throughout Europe and Asia.

In 2014, Tereshkina danced Nikiya in American Ballet Theatre's production of La Bayadère.

Repertoire
Viktoria has danced ballets choreographed by Marius Petipa, Yury Grigorovich, Alexei Ratmansky, Michel Fokine, George Balanchine, etc.

Marius Petipa
Giselle (Giselle, Myrtha, Zulma)
The Sleeping Beauty (Aurora, Gold Fairy, Diamond Fairy)
Swan Lake (Odette-Odile, Big Swans)
La Bayadère (Nikiya, Gamzatti)
Raymonda (Raymonda)
Le Corsaire (Medora)
Don Quixote (Kitri)
Paquita Grand Pas

Yuri Grigorovich
A Legend of Love (Queen Mekhemene Banu)
The Stone Flower (Mistress of Copper Mountain)

Michel Fokine
Scheherazade (Zobeide)
The Firebird (Fire Bird)

Alexei Ratmansky
Concerto DSCH
The Little Humpbacked Horse (Tsar Maiden)
Cinderella (Khudishka, Female Dance)
Anna Karenina (Anna Karenina)

George Balanchine
Jewels (Rubies, Diamonds)
Apollo (Polyhymnia, Calliope, Terpischore)
A Midsummer Night's Dream (Titania)
Symphony in C (I. Allegro Vivo)
Swan Lake
Serenade
Theme and Variations
The Four Temperaments
Piano Concerto No 2/Ballet Imperial
Tarantella

Frederick Ashton
Sylvia (Sylvia)
Marguerite and Armand (Marguerite)

William Forsythe
In the Middle, Somewhat Elevated
Approximate Sonata

Yuri Smekalov
Paquita (Paquita); production by Yuri Smekalov
The Bronze Horseman (Parasha); choreography by Yuri Smekalov
Bolero Factory (The Soul)

Hans van Manen
5 Tangos
Adagio Hammerklavier

Other choreographers
The Fountain of Bakhchisarai (Zarema); choreography by Rostislav Zakharov
The Young Lady and the Hooligan (The Young Lady); choreography by Konstantin Boyarsky
Romeo and Juliet (Juliet); choreography by Leonid Lavrovsky
Spartacus (Phrygia); choreography by Leonid Yakobson
Grand Pas Classique; choreography by Viktor Gzovsky
In the Night; choreography by Jerome Robbins
Le Jeune Homme et la Mort (The Girl); choreography by Roland Petit
Manon (Manon); choreography by Kenneth MacMillan
Carmen-Suite (Carmen); choreography by Alberto Alonso
Etudes (Soloist); choreography by Harald Lander
Ondine (Queen of the Sea); choreography by Pierre Lacotte
Dolce, con fuoco; choreography by Svetlana Anufrieva
The Ring; choreography by Alexei Miroshnichenko
Aria Suspended (soloist); choreography by Peter Quanz
Diana and Actaeon Pas de Deux; choreography by Agrippina Vaganova
The Nutcracker (Masha); choreography by Vasili Vainonen
The Cat on the Tree and Violin Concerto No. 2; choreography by Anton Pimonov
Pulcinella (Pimpinella); choreography by Ilya Zhivoi
The Village Don Juan; choreography by Leonid Yakobson
Tango-Fugato; choreography by Alexei Miroshnichenko
Adulte; choreography by Ilya Zhivoi
Elegy. Ophelia; choreography by Ksenia Zvereva

Awards
The awards received by Viktoria Tereshkina include:
2005: Golden Sofit: Best Female Role in Ballet (Approximate Sonata)
2006: Golden Sofit: Best Female Role in Ballet (Queen of the Sea in Ondine)
2006: Rising Star award from Ballet magazine
2008: Honoured Artist of Russia
2010: Ms Virtuosa award at the International Ballet Festival
2014: Golden Sofit: Best Female Role in Ballet (Sylvia)
2017: Golden Mask for "Best Female Role in Ballet (Violin Concerto No. 2, choreography by Anton Pimonov)
2018: People's Artist of Russia

References

1983 births
Living people
Russian ballerinas
Mariinsky Ballet principal dancers
Prima ballerinas
People from Krasnoyarsk
People's Artists of Russia
21st-century Russian ballet dancers